Scott Lucas and the Married Men is the solo project/band of Scott Lucas, the guitarist, bassist, and lead vocalist of the alternative rock band Local H.

Formation
The project started when Lucas started writing and sending songs to an ex-girlfriend in an effort to win her back.  Originally the songs were not intended for release, but upon realizing he had an album's worth of material he put together a band to play with.  Randy Payne and Tom Szidon were recruited from Lucas' cover band The Cold Space, and Aaron Duggins and Rebecca Manthe came from The Tossers.

Album and tour
Scott Lucas and The Married Men released their first album on February 16, 2010, titled George Lassos The Moon.  The band played shows sporadically around Chicago throughout 2009, and embarked on their first multiple city tour on February 12, 2010.  The Absolute Beginners EP was released on October 19, 2010.

On June 5, 2012, the band released their second studio album, entitled Blood Half Moon.  The album was recorded at Steve Albini's Electrical Studio in Chicago.  The band also toured the country in promotion of the record.

Band members
Current members
Scott Lucas – lead vocals, guitar
Jason Batchko – organ, piano
Aaron Duggins – accordion
Rebecca Manthe (Rebecca Brooke M.) – violin
Peter "Pete" Muschong – guitar, backing vocals
Randy Payne – drums
Tom Szidon – bass, backing vocals

References

External links
 scottlucasandthemarriedmen.com, Official website.

Alternative rock groups from Illinois
Musical groups from Chicago